Roger Birnbaum (born November 14, 1950) is an American film producer who owns the company Spyglass Media Group, and was co-CEO and co-chairman of Metro-Goldwyn-Mayer. His two greatest box office hits as producer have been Rush Hour 2 and The Tourist which grossed US$347,325,802 and US$278,346,189 worldwide respectively. In 2016, he produced The Magnificent Seven.

Early life 
Birnbaum was born to a Jewish family in Teaneck, New Jersey, the son of Arlene (née Steinlauf) and Norman Birnbaum. His father was a World War II veteran who went into the embroidery business with his father after the war, and used his profits in 1967 to build the Stonehenge, a residential building in New Jersey. Birnbaum graduated from Teaneck High School in 1968 and attended the University of Denver.

Career 
Birnbaum started out in the music industry at Arista Records working under Clive Davis. A&M Records brought him out to Hollywood becoming its West Coast A&R executive, where he switch over to film. While working at film, he was appointed president of Fair Dinkum Productions, which was headed by Henry Winkler, who supervised Young Sherlock Holmes and The Sure Thing. He worked at United Artists, Guber-Peters Co. (president in 1989) then 20th Century Fox. He was president of production at 20th Century Fox by 1992.

Caravan Pictures was founded by Birnbaum and Joe Roth as a production company at Disney in 1992 to fill the Disney Studios' then-yearly 50 to 60 production and distribution slots. Birnbaum previously left Caravan at the prompting of then Disney studio chief Joe Roth as Disney was cutting its yearly production output and shutting down Caravan. In August 1998, Birnbaum with Gary Barber, former vice chairman and COO of Morgan Creek Productions founded Spyglass Entertainment.

On December 20, 2010, after the Metro-Goldwyn-Mayer had emerged from bankruptcy, Birnbaum and Barber became co-Chairs and co-CEOs of the studio. On October 3, 2012, Birnbaum announced his intention to exit his role as an MGM executive and return to "hands-on" producing. He will remain with the studio to produce films on "an exclusive basis".

He has since founded three production companies, Pin High Productions, Cave 76 Productions and with Eli Roth, Arts District Entertainment. By September 8, 2016, his exclusivity with MGM had ended.

Personal life 
His first wife was Pamela West; they had one daughter Claire Birnbaum Block (born 1987). He married then-restaurant guest relations manager Leslie Lopez in 2013.
Birnbaum and Lopez divorced in 2019
He was previously in a seven-year relationship with actress Teri Garr.

Filmography

Film

Television

References

External links 
 

Film producers from New Jersey
Living people
Teaneck High School alumni
University of Denver alumni
American film studio executives
20th-century American Jews
Metro-Goldwyn-Mayer executives
1950 births
21st-century American Jews